Sumska Street is the main street of Kharkiv, Ukraine. It stretches through the centre of the city from the Constitution Square to Bilhorodske shose (Bilhorod highway). The street also serves as an administrative line between Kyivskyi and Shevchenkivskyi district of Kharkiv city.

Sumska street appeared as a road from the Kharkiv fortress to Sumy and used to call “Sumskyi shlyakh” (Sumy roadway). However, in a short time the road was surrounded by the buildings and turned to vibrant street. In the 20th century it became the thoroughfare of the city.

The street is served by Kharkiv Metro, by the stations Universytet (University) and Istorychnyi Muzei (Museum of History).

Gallery

Bibliography
 М.Т. Дяченко – Історія харківських вулиць – Харків, 1961
 Мачулин Л. Улицы и площади города Харькова – Харьков, 2007

External links 

Streets in Kharkiv
Kyivskyi District (Kharkiv)
Shevchenkivskyi District (Kharkiv)